Pregnana Milanese railway station is a railway station in Italy. Located on the Turin–Milan railway, it serves the municipality of Pregnana Milanese. The train services are operated by Trenord.

Train services 
The station is served by the following service(s):

Milan Metropolitan services (S6) Novara - Rho - Milan - Treviglio

See also 
 Milan suburban railway network

References

Railway stations in Lombardy
Milan S Lines stations
Railway stations opened in 2009